Mathew B. Lowrie (May 12, 1773 – July 28, 1850), served as the Mayor of Pittsburgh from 1830 to 1831.

Early life
Lowrie was born in Edinburgh, Scotland, from where he emigrated with his parents the U.S. state of to Pennsylvania. As a young man he came to Pittsburgh  and started a thriving grocery business. Lowrie was also active in religion, serving many years as a Sunday school teacher at the First Presbyterian Church. His brother, Walter Lowrie, served in the United States Senate, and his son, Walter H. Lowrie, went on to become Chief Justice of the Pennsylvania Supreme Court.

Pittsburgh politics
Mathew Lowrie was elected mayor in 1830 and is credited with "modernizing" the fire department.

The city bought its very first steam powered fire engine and named it the "citizen". Lowrie was also instrumental in managing the city's rapid growth by adopting the "ward" system of governance for the first time in western Pennsylvania.

Later life
Lowrie died in 1850 after a bout with cholera, he is buried in Allegheny Cemetery and the site is marked by an obelisk.

References

1773 births
1850 deaths
American Presbyterians
Deaths from cholera
Scottish emigrants to the United States
Mayors of Pittsburgh
Politicians from Edinburgh
Infectious disease deaths in Pennsylvania
Anti-Masonic Party politicians from Pennsylvania
Burials at Allegheny Cemetery